Oleksandr Funderat (born 24 November 1972) is a Ukrainian former football player and current manager. After his playing career at FC Zirka in Kirovograd, Ukraine, he went on to become a coaching teacher at the Zirka Youth Sports School. Two years later, in 1994, Funderat became a coaching teacher at the Sports Lyceum in Kirovograd. After a short two year stint, he moved on to become a teacher of Sports and Pedagogy at the Kirovograd State Pedagogical University. In 2000, he became the FC Shakhtar-3 Donetsk coach, a position, that he held until 2013.

References 

1972 births
Living people
Ukrainian footballers
FC Zirka Kropyvnytskyi players
FC Shakhtar-3 Donetsk managers
Association footballers not categorized by position
Ukrainian football managers